O2 (Germany) GmbH & Co OHG v Commission (2006) T-328/03 is an EU competition law case, concerning the requirements for a restriction of competition to be found under TFEU article 101.

Facts
O2 (which is the trading name for Telefónica Europe plc) and T-Mobile made a ‘roaming’ agreement, designed to give O2 a foothold in the German market while it was building its own network.

The Commission found that the agreement restricted competition at the wholesale and retail level, but under article 101(3) found that the agreement would overall improve competition in the relevant markets, and gave an exemption. This was for a shorter period than the parties wanted, and they sought annulment of the Commission’s Decision.

Judgment
The General Court held that the Commission had failed to examine the anti-competitive effects of the agreement, as it was acknowledged that the agreement did not have an anti-competitive object.

See also

EU competition law

Notes

References

European Union competition case law
2006 in case law
2006 in the European Union